Tela F.C. is a Honduran football club from Tela, Atlántida Department. It was founded on 2014 and currently plays at the Honduran Liga Nacional de Ascenso.

Current squad

References 
http://fenafuth.org.hn/

 
Association football clubs established in 1979